HD 195564 is the Henry Draper Catalogue designation for a star in the southern constellation of Capricornus. It is faintly visible to the naked eye with an apparent visual magnitude of 5.65. Parallax measurements give us an estimate of its distance as 81 light years. This is a candidate wide binary system as a faint companion star shares a common proper motion with the brighter primary component.

Based upon the spectrum of light emitted by the primary, it has a stellar classification of G2 V. This indicates that it is a G-type main sequence star that is generating energy through the process of thermonuclear fusion in its core region. It has an estimated mass of 1.097 times the mass of the Sun, but a measured radius that is 1.867 times as large. As a result, it shines with 2.705 times the luminosity of the Sun. The abundance of elements in this star is similar to that in the Sun, although it is an older star with an age of around 8.2 billion years. The effective temperature of the stellar atmosphere is 5,421 K, giving it the yellow-hued glow of an ordinary K-type star.

The secondary companion has an apparent magnitude of 11.30, and a mass just 55% that of the Sun. As measured in 1965, it had an angular separation of 3.20″ from the primary, along a position angle of 27° The pair orbit each other with an estimated period of around 510 years.

References

G-type main-sequence stars
Binary stars
Capricornus (constellation)
7845
BD-10 5423
0792.1
195564
101345